Betagi is a Union Council of Rangunia Upazila in Chittagong District, Chittagong Division, Bangladesh.

Geography
Betagi is a union of Rangunia Upazila, situated on the bank of Karnaphuli river, area 4378 acres, located in between 22°28' north latitudes and in between 91°5' east longitudes. Karnaphuli flows down the east and south side beside Betagi. In the east side of Betagi is Sarafbhata Union, in the west side is Bagoan Union of Raozan Upazila, in the north side is Pomra Union and in the west side Jaishtapura Union of Boalkhali Upazila.

Administration
The UP chairman of Betagi is Md.Sofiul Alam Sofi

Betagi has 16 mauzas and 40 villages. The 16 mauzas are Antorghona, Baniakhola, Betagi-1, Betagi-2, Betagi-3, Betagi-4, Betagi-5, Betagi-6, Chengkhali-1, Chengkhali-2, Dhemirchora, Dingollonga-1, Dingollonga-2, Gungunia Betagi, Kaukhali, and Tinchowdia.

Population
Population Total 20618. Male: 10312  Female:10306

Education 
 Rotary Betagi Union High School (1968)
Kaukhali Anwara Begum High School   
Al- Haj Abul Bashar Chowdhury High School

See also 
Betagi Upazila

References 

Unions of Rangunia Upazila